is a Japanese musician and former vocalist of visual kei rock band Rentrer en Soi. Satsuki was a member of Rentrer en Soi from its creation in 2001 until it disbanded in 2008. In 2009, he launched a solo career. He counts Dir En Grey, Nirvana, and U2 among his musical influences.

History
After Rentrer en Soi disbanded in 2008, Satsuki launched a solo career in 2009. In an interview with JaME, he stated "My former band had a lot more shouting, but for now, I want to sing more beautifully." 
Satsuki has released four maxi singles, "Awake" on May 9, 2009, "Crystal" on August 21, 2009, "Moon Spiral," on February 14, 2010, and "Innocent" on June 27, 2011. His mini-album Upper Region was released on September 1, 2010.

On July 4, 2009 Satsuki performed at Anime Expo in Los Angeles, California. In September 2009, he performed at Anime Vegas in Las Vegas, Nevada. He also performed at Oni-Con in Houston, Texas, on October 30, 2009, with a special musical appearance by guitarist Tomo Asaha of Echostream.

In June 2011, Satsuki launched his new overseas unit band with Tomo Asaha, called "Moon Stream", with a debut performance at Sacramento, California's Kintoki-Con 2011. Moon Stream is scheduled to headline Anime Weekend Atlanta in Atlanta, Georgia in September 2011.

In August 2013, Moon Stream attended Quebec's Otakuthon, performing in a concert on the evening of August 16, and then in an acoustic live session on August 18.

Satsuki's musical contributions also include the theme song "Awake" for the PSP game Amnesia, a visual novel by Otomate.  
Outside of music, Satsuki is scheduled to appear in the upcoming Japanese movie Cool Blue. He also hosts a new monthly visual kei variety show called VisuBara with other visual kei artists, which is scheduled to debut August 14, 2011.

Discography

Singles

Albums & EP

DVD

References

External links
  
 Official blog 
 MySpace
 JaME interview

Visual kei musicians
Japanese multi-instrumentalists
Japanese rock musicians
Japanese male rock singers
Japanese male singer-songwriters
Japanese singer-songwriters
Japanese male pop singers
Living people
Year of birth missing (living people)